Chalmers Edward "Spanky" Alford (May 22, 1955 – March 24, 2008) was an American jazz guitarist. Alford was born in Philadelphia. He was well known for his playing style and use of arpeggiations. He had an illustrious career as a gospel quartet guitar player in the 1960s, 1970s, and 1980s with groups such as the Mighty Clouds of Joy.

Later in life, he found a new career in the neo-soul movement of the 1990s and 2000s, most notably contributing to the sounds of D'Angelo and Tony Toni Toné. Alford played guitar as part of The Soultronics (D'angelo's band for his 2000 "Voodoo" tour), alongside Questlove, James Poyser, Pino Palladino, and Anthony Hamilton. He was a teacher, and was credited with teaching Raphael Saadiq, Isaiah Sharkey, and others to play guitar.  He played on several albums with artists such as Joss Stone, John Mayer, Mary J. Blige, Raphael Saadiq, D'Angelo and Roy Hargrove.

Though he retired from touring years prior, Alford made a rare public appearance performing with the John Mayer Trio as a surprise guest on September 26, 2005, during their stop in Nashville, Tennessee. It is his last known public performance. Audio from the show eventually ended up on the Trio's only official release, a compilation of performances from the tour called Try!, appearing on the title track at the end of the album.

Alford died in March 2008, at the age of 52, in Huntsville, Alabama due to complications from diabetes.

Discography
As sideman/guest

 Stan Jones, Out of the Shadows
 D'Angelo, Voodoo
 D'Angelo, Black Messiah
 The Roots, Illadelph Halflife, Things Fall Apart
 Joss Stone, Introducing Joss Stone
 Vikter Duplaix, Bold and Beautiful
 John Mayer, Continuum
 Vick Allen, Simply Soul
 Evelyn Turrentine-Agee, Call Jesus
 Evelyn Turrentine-Agee, Go Through
 Ali Shaheed Muhammad, Shaheedullah and Stereotypes
 A Tribe Called Quest, The Love Movement
 Roy Hargrove, Strength
 Mary J. Blige, The Breakthrough
 Norman Brown, West Coast Coolin'''
 The Canton Spirituals, New Life: Live in Harvey, IL Rhian Benson, Gold Coast Roy Hargrove, Hard Groove Angie Stone, Black Diamond Raphael Saadiq, Instant Vintage Anthony Hamilton
 2Pac, Until the End of Time Al Green, Lay It Down The Mighty Clouds of Joy, Pray for Me D'Angelo and the Vanguard, Black Messiah''

References

1955 births
2008 deaths
American blues guitarists
American soul guitarists
American male guitarists
20th-century American guitarists
Guitarists from Philadelphia
20th-century American male musicians
21st-century American guitarists
21st-century American male musicians
The Soultronics members